The Sendlinger Tor (translated: Sendling Gate) is a city gate at the southern extremity of the historic old town area of Munich. It served as a fortification for defence and is one of Munich's three remaining gothic town gates (the other two being the Isartor and the Karlstor).

Location

Sendlinger Tor (located at Sendlinger Str 49) lies at the southern end of Sendlingerstrasse, the north-south thoroughfare through Munich's old town. Sendlinger Tor thus separates the old city from the Isar suburb.

History

As part of the great urban expansion by Ludwig the Bavarian (from 1285 to 1337), a second city wall with four town gates was built, of which Sendlinger Tor was one. In 1318, Sendlinger Tor was first mentioned as a starting point for the road to Italy, but probably existed earlier. Originally, there was only the distinctive central tower gate (typical of the Munich city gates of the time). In 1420 that was supplemented by the two flanking towers, which were required to terminate the end of the outer city wall properly.

In 1808 the central tower was demolished. In 1860 a restoration of the two remaining Medieval flanking towers and the wall with three arches took place. In 1906, these original three arches were replaced by the one large single arch.

In the Second World War, the gate was barely damaged. It was refurbished in the 1980s. On the Sendlinger Tor, a remnant of the old city wall can still be seen, which previously went up the Herzog-Wilhelm-Str.

Public Transportation
It gives its name to the Sendlinger Tor U-Bahn station.

External links

 Munich-Info
 muenchen.de: Sendlinger Tor
 
 360°x180° Panorama Sendlinger Tor QuickTime required

Buildings and structures completed in the 14th century
Buildings and structures in Munich
Gothic architecture in Munich
Tourist attractions in Munich
Gates in Germany
Gates Munich